Robert Kellard, aka Robert Stevens (April 23, 1915 – January 13, 1981), was an American actor who appeared in over 60 films between 1937 and 1951.

Early years
Kellard was born Robert Dorsey Kellard April 23, 1915, in Los Angeles, California. His father, Ralph Kellard (1884–1955), was also an actor. 

Robert Kellard graduated from Hollywood High School and attended Santa Monica Junior College for a year. His older brother, Thomas, acted in films briefly before going into a different career.

Career

Film
Kellard entered in Hollywood in 1937 in the film Annapolis Salute, directed by Christy Cabanne. (Another source says, "Robert made his film debut in ... A Connecticut Yankee (1931).")After that, he bounced back and forth from starring roles in low-budget films like Island in the Sky, Time Out for Murder, While New York Sleeps, and supporting roles in Boy Friend and Here I Am a Stranger, until he found the time to make two serials for Republic Pictures.

Although third billed, Kellard was ostensibly the hero in Republic’s adaptation of Sax Rohmer’s Drums of Fu Manchu. He followed this by playing the sidekick of Allan 'Rocky' Lane in the Zane Grey comic strip based King of the Royal Mounted. Kellard then starred two serials for Columbia Pictures, Perils of the Royal Mounted and Tex Granger, and accepted supporting roles in the films Gilda and The Jolson Story. He also displayed his comedic chops in several Three Stooges comedies, such as Rhythm and Weep, They Stooge to Conga and Squareheads of the Round Table. His best known role with the Stooges was that of the menacing pirate Black Louie in Three Little Pirates.

After Kellard signed a contract with Columbia Pictures in 1942, the studio changed his name to Robert Stevens.

Stage
On Broadway, Kellard performed in Mother Lode (1937) and Hitch Your Wagon (1937).

Television
Kellard made his last appearance in a 1951 episode of ABC's Western television series, The Lone Ranger.

Personal life
Kellard's marriage to BeBe LaMonte ended in divorce in 1942.

Death
Kellard died of post-obstructive pneumonia in the Wadsworth V.A. Medical center in Los Angeles, California, on January 13, 1981, at age 65.

Selected filmography

 A Connecticut Yankee (1931)
 Annapolis Salute (1937) – Cadet
 Second Honeymoon (1937) – Reporter (uncredited)
 Nothing Sacred (1937) – Nightclub Patron (uncredited)
 Change of Heart (1938) – Artist (uncredited)
 Walking Down Broadway (1938) – Bob Randall
 Island in the Sky (1938) – Peter Vincent
 Battle of Broadway (1938) – Jack Bundy
 Josette (1938) – Reporter
 Gateway (1938) – Reporter (uncredited)
 My Lucky Star (1938) – Pennell
 Time Out for Murder (1938) – Johnny Martin
 Always in Trouble (1938) – Pete Graham
 While New York Sleeps (1938) – Malcolm Hunt
 Wife, Husband and Friend (1939) – Bank Teller (uncredited)
 Boy Friend (1939) – Tommy Bradley
 Stop, Look and Love (1939) – Dick Grant
 Here I Am a Stranger (1939) – College Student
 Drums of Fu Manchu (1940, Serial) – Allan Parker
 King of the Royal Mounted (1940, Serial) – Tom Merritt, Jr.
 Phantom of Chinatown (1940) – Tommy Dean
 Prairie Pioneers (1941) – Roberto Ortega
 Down in San Diego (1941) – Bell Captain (uncredited)
 Gentleman from Dixie (1941) – Lance Terrill
 Escort Girl (1941) – Drake Hamilton
 Shadow of the Thin Man (1941) – Policeman (uncredited)
 Man from Headquarters (1942) – Hotel Clerk
 Joe Smith, American (1942) – Mel Lewis (uncredited)
 Hello, Annapolis (1942) – George Crandall
 Sweetheart of the Fleet (1942) – Ens. George 'Tip' Landers
 Perils of the Royal Mounted (1942, Serial) – Sgt. Mack MacLane RCMP
 Parachute Nurse (1942) – Minor Role (uncredited)
 My Sister Eileen (1942) – Bus Driver (uncredited)
 The Spirit of Stanford (1942) – Cliff Bonnard
 Smith of Minnesota (1942) – George Smith
 Boston Blackie Goes Hollywood (1942) – Ticket Clerk (uncredited)
 Pardon My Gun (1942) – Henchman (uncredited)
 The Fighting Buckaroo (1943) – Fletch Thatcher (uncredited)
 Throw a Saddle on a Star (1946) – Burton (uncredited)
 Gilda (1946) – Man at Masquerade (uncredited)
 Night Editor (1946) – Doc Cochrane
 That Texas Jamboree (1946) – Henchman Tom
 The Return of Rusty (1946) – Sgt. Jack Beals
 The Unknown (1946) – James Wetherford
 Sing While You Dance (1946) – Buzz Nelson
 The Jolson Story (1946) – Henry – Orchestra Leader
 Lone Star Moonlight (1946) – Eddie Jackson
 Blondie's Big Moment (1947) – Joe (uncredited)
 The Thirteenth Hour (1947) – Truck Driver (uncredited)
 The Lone Hand Texan (1947) – Boomer Kildea (uncredited)
 Millie's Daughter (1947) – Hotel Clerk (uncredited)
 Framed (1947) – Man in Coffee Shop (uncredited)
 The Millerson Case (1947) – Dr. Prescott
 The Corpse Came C.O.D. (1947) – Reporter (uncredited)
 Roses Are Red (1947) – Interne
 Tex Granger: Midnight Rider of the Plains (1948) – Tex Granger, The Night Rider
 The Argyle Secrets (1948) – Melvin Rubin – Cop
 Canon City (1948) – Officer Winston R. Williams
 Bride of Vengeance (1949) – Guard (uncredited)
 Too Late for Tears (1949) – Policeman (uncredited)
 Red, Hot and Blue (1949) – Police Switchboard Operator (uncredited)

References

External links

Robert Kellard at threestooges.net

American male film actors
American male television actors
1915 births
1981 deaths
Male actors from Los Angeles
20th-century American male actors